Carleman's inequality is an inequality in mathematics, named after Torsten Carleman, who proved it in 1923 and used it to prove the Denjoy–Carleman theorem on quasi-analytic classes.

Statement

Let  be a sequence of non-negative real numbers, then

The constant  (euler number) in the inequality is optimal, that is, the inequality does not always hold if  is replaced by a smaller number. The inequality is strict (it holds with "<" instead of "≤") if some element in the sequence is non-zero.

Integral version

Carleman's inequality has an integral version, which states that

for any f ≥ 0.

Carleson's inequality

A generalisation, due to Lennart Carleson, states the following:

for any convex function g with g(0) = 0, and for any -1 < p < ∞,

Carleman's inequality follows from the case p = 0.

Proof

An elementary proof is sketched below. From the inequality of arithmetic and geometric means applied to  the numbers 

where MG stands for geometric mean, and MA — for arithmetic mean. The Stirling-type inequality  applied to  implies

 for all 

Therefore,

whence

proving the inequality. As a   consequence, Carleman's inequality is never an equality for a convergent series, unless all  vanish, just because the harmonic series is divergent.

One can also prove Carleman's inequality by starting with Hardy's inequality

for the non-negative numbers a1,a2,...  and p > 1,  replacing each an with a, and letting p → ∞.

Versions for specific sequences

Christian Axler and Mehdi Hassani investigated Carleman's inequality for the specific cases of  where  is the th prime number, They also investigated the case where .

Notes

References

External links
 

Real analysis
Inequalities